The Posavina rebellion broke out in the region of Bosnian Posavina, then part of the Ottoman Empire. It was led by Ottoman Bosnian nobility.

Sources

May 1836 events
19th-century rebellions
Conflicts in 1836
Rebellions against the Ottoman Empire
1836 in the Ottoman Empire
Ottoman period in the history of Bosnia and Herzegovina
Ottoman Bosnian nobility